Wood Lake is a lake in a chain of five major lakes which occupies portions of the Okanagan Valley in the interior of British Columbia, Canada. 
The lakes of the Okanagan Valley were formed by about 8900 BP.
Wood Lake is immediately south of Kalamalka Lake and in 1908 was connected to it by a dredged channel (the Oyama canal).  
Situated between Oyama and Winfield, it has a solid reputation for rainbow trout fishing. 
The lake is named after Tom Wood, who settled on the south end of the lake around 1860.

The dry climate and suitable soil has encouraged development of a substantial tree fruit industry around the lake and throughout the valley. 
The upper watershed is heavily forested and has been logged for several decades. 
The lower elevation of the watershed is described as a Ponderosa pine/bunchgrass area.

Physical data
Normal range of annual water level fluctuation: 1.2 m
Number of beaches: 4
There is also a Wood Lake in Fraser Valley, an area of British Columbia.

Images

References

 Anonymous (1974a). Kalamalka-Wood Lake Basin Water Resource Management Study. Water Investigations Branch, British Columbia Water Resources Service, Victoria, B.C., 209 pp.
 Anonymous (1974b). Limnology of the Major Lakes in the Okanagan Basin. Canada - British Columbia Okanagan Basin Agreement, Final Report, Technical Supplement V. British Columbia Water Resources Service, Victoria, British Columbia, 261 pp.
 Anonymous (1974c). The Main Report of the Consultative Board. Canada - British Columbia Okanagan Basin Agreement. British Columbia Water Resources Service, Victoria, British Columbia.
 Stockner, J.G. and Northcote, T.G. (1974). Recent limnological studies of Okanagan Basin lakes and their contribution to comprehensive water resource planning. Journal of the Fisheries Research Board of Canada, 31, 955–976.
 Walker, I. R., E. D. Reavie, S. Palmer, and R. N. Nordin, 1993. A palaeoenvironmental assessment of human impact on Wood Lake, Okanagan Valley, British Columbia.  Quaternary International  20: 51–70.

Osoyoos Division Yale Land District
Lakes of the Okanagan
Articles containing video clips